Psoriatic erythroderma  represents a form of psoriasis that affects all body sites, including the face, hands, feet, nails, trunk, and extremities.  This specific form of psoriasis affects 3 percent of persons diagnosed with psoriasis. First-line treatments for psoriatic erythroderma include immunosuppressive medications such as methotrexate, acitretin, or ciclosporin.

See also
 Skin lesion
 List of cutaneous conditions

References

External links 

Psoriasis